The 2007 Women's World Snooker Championship was a women's snooker tournament played in the United Kingdom in 2007. Defending champion Reanne Evans beat Katie Henrick 5–3 in the final to win her third world title.

Tournament summary
Reanne Evans was the reigning champion, having won the 2006 World Women's Snooker Championship. The 2007 tournament was played at the Cambridge Snooker Centre, the same venue as the 2005 and 2006 championships. Four round-robin qualifying group held over two days each produced two qualifiers for the quarter-finals.

In the final, Evans was level 3–3 with Henrick before winning the next two frames to claim her third successive title. 

Evans compiled the highest break of the tournament, 87. She received £800 in prize money as champion.

Main draw
Quarter-finals onwards shown below. Source: Snooker Scene

References

World Women's Snooker Championship
World Women's Championship
World Women's Snooker Championship
World Snooker Championship